Scotchgard is a 3M brand of products, a stain and durable water repellent applied to fabric, furniture, and carpets to protect them from stains. Scotchgard products typically rely on organofluorine chemicals as the main active ingredient along with petroleum distillate solvents.

Development of the formula 
The original formula for Scotchgard was discovered accidentally in 1952 by 3M chemists Patsy Sherman and Samuel Smith. Sales began in 1956, and in 1973 the two chemists received a patent for the formula.

3M reformulated Scotchgard and since June 2003 has replaced PFOS with perfluorobutanesulfonic acid (PFBS). PFBS has a much shorter half-life in people than PFOS (a little over one month vs. 5.4 years). 3M now states that Scotchgard utilizes a proprietary fluorinated urethane.

Environmental concerns
During 1999, the United States Environmental Protection Agency (EPA) began an investigation into the class of chemicals used in Scotchgard, after receiving information on the global distribution and toxicity of perfluorooctane sulfonate (PFOS), the "key ingredient" of Scotchgard. The compound perfluorooctanesulfonamide (PFOSA), a PFOS precursor, was an ingredient and also has been described as the "key ingredient" of Scotchgard. Under US EPA pressure, in May 2000, 3M announced the phaseout of the production of PFOA, PFOS, and PFOS-related products. In May 2009, PFOS was determined to be a persistent organic pollutant (POP) by the Stockholm Convention. Following the EPA's investigation into 3M Contamination of Minnesota Groundwater, in 2018, 3M agreed to pay the state of Minnesota $850 million to settle a $5 billion lawsuit over drinking water contaminated by PFOA and other fluorosurfactants.

See also

Fluorocarbon
Fluorosurfactant

References 

3M brands
Organofluorides
Products introduced in 1956
Sulfonic acids